Mark Romero (born July 21, 1963) is a retired American second generation professional wrestler better known by his ring name Mark Youngblood.

Professional wrestling career
Mark Romero is the son of Ricky Romero. He started wrestling as Mark Youngblood in 1980 and worked for the National Wrestling Alliance's Jim Crockett Promotions as a tag team with Wahoo McDaniel. He wrestled in Florida Championship Wrestling in 1985 with his brother Jay and formed a tag team with his younger brother Chris Romero in 1986 following Jay's death.

The Romeros achieved some success in the World Wrestling Council and later in the Global Wrestling Federation and the United States Wrestling Association as "The Tribal Nation". They also had a brief stint in World Championship Wrestling as "The Renegade Warriors". Mark retired from wrestling in 1999.

In early 2006, he wrestled at the Amarillo, Texas, based indy-wrestling company West Texas Wrestling Legends ran by his brother Chris. He made several appearances for the company before going back into retirement in July 2006. On January 13, 2007, he resurfaced in WTWL and defeated the WTWL Champion Thunder to win the championship. After the match, WTWL wrestlers "Hobo" Hank, Mike DiBiase, Dice Murdock, nephew "Radical" Ricky Romero III and Mark's brother Chris Romero came down to celebrate the win with the new champion. Romero explained that his return was for one night only and he later vacated the WTWL Championship.

Championships and accomplishments
Cauliflower Alley Club
Family Wrestling Award (2015) – with Chris Youngblood, Jay Youngblood and Ricky Romero
Central States Wrestling
NWA Central States Tag Team Championship (2 times) – with Mike George
NWA Central States Television Championship (2 times)
Championship Wrestling from Florida
NWA United States Tag Team Championship (Florida version) (2 times) – with Jay Youngblood
Global Wrestling Federation
GWF Tag Team Championship (1 time) – with Chris Youngblood
Mid-Atlantic Championship Wrestling
NWA Television Championship (1 time)
NWA World Tag Team Championship (Mid-Atlantic version) (2 times) – with Wahoo McDaniel
Pro Wrestling Illustrated
PWI ranked him #321 of the top 500 singles wrestlers in the PWI 500 in 1991
PWI ranked him # 100 of the 100 best tag teams of the PWI Years with Chris Youngblood in 2003.
Southern Championship Wrestling
SCW Tag Team Championship (1 time) - with Chris Youngblood
West Texas Wrestling Legends
WTWL Championship (1 time)
World Class Championship Wrestling
WCCW Television Championship (1 time)
World Wrestling Council
WWC Caribbean Tag Team Championship (3 times) – with Chris Youngblood
WWC World Tag Team Championship  (6 times) – with Chris Youngblood

References

External links 
 

1963 births
American male professional wrestlers
Faux Native American professional wrestlers
Living people
NWA/WCW World Television Champions
Sportspeople from Amarillo, Texas
Professional wrestlers from Texas
20th-century professional wrestlers
NWA United States Tag Team Champions (Florida version)
WCW World Tag Team Champions